Jay Trump (1957–1988) was an American thoroughbred racehorse and one of only two horses to win both the Maryland Hunt Cup and the Grand National steeplechase races. Jay Trump won three Maryland Hunt Cups, 1963, 1964, 1966.  In 1965 he won the English Grand National.

Background
Jay Trump was born April 1, 1957 and was the product of an unplanned breeding.  His sire was Tonga Prince, his dam Be Trump.  They were paddock mates, Be Trump was considered infertile.  He spent his early years training at "Shanty Town", located near the Charles Town race track, in West Virginia, where he raced.

Racing career
Jay Trump's early race record was unremarkable; Jay Trump ran 8 times, with one second-place finish, earning $220.
In 1960, amateur steeplechase jockey, Crompton "Tommy" Smith, purchased Jay Trump for Mary Stephenson, who was a family friend.  He was purchased as a steeplechase prospect. Tommy Smith was the grandson of the great sportsman and steeplechase racer Harry Worcester Smith, who in 1912 and 1913 traveled to Ireland, England and France as the invited "Master of the Westmeath Hounds."

Jay Trump won his first race in 1962.  In 1963 he won his first Maryland Hunt Cup, setting a course record, defeating Mountain Dew.  Plans were hatched to take Jay Trump to England for the Grand National, but it was thought better to wait another year.  Jay Trump won the Maryland Hunt Cup for a second time in 1964, again defeating Mountain Dew.  Later that year he was shipped to England.  He won his first race for trainer Fred Winter at Sandown on October 21, 1964; this was also the first winner for the trainer. Jay Trump went on to win two more races and finished second in the King George VI Chase, as he prepared for the Grand National.

In 1965 Jay Trump won the English Grand National, defeating Freddy in a remarkable battle to the line.  He was the first Maryland Hunt Cup horse to win the Grand National, as well as the first American owned, bred and ridden winner of the Grand National.  Since that time, Ben Nevis II has repeated the feat of winning the Maryland Hunt Cup in 1977 and 1978, and the Grand National in 1980.  After his Grand National victory, Jay Trump went to France to run in the Grand Steeplechase.  He was made the favorite, but finished third to Hyeres III, who had also won the race in 1964.

Jay Trump then returned to the United States, where he ran in one more Maryland Hunt Cup, in 1966.  He won that race, and was promptly retired. Mountain Dew was second to Jay Trump in this race for the third time.  Mountain Dew also won three Maryland Hunt Cup races; Jay Trump and Mountain Dew formed a tremendous rivalry in the 1960s.

Honors
Jay Trump is in the National Museum of Racing and Hall of Fame.

Jay Trump was part of the first group of horses that entered the Maryland Thoroughbred Hall of Fame. He is buried at the finish line of the Kentucky Horse Park's Steeplechase course.

Books
Books that have been written about Jay Trump include Peter Winant's Jay Trump: A Steeplechasing Saga, and Jane Mcllvaine's The Will to Win: The True Story of Tommy Smith and Jay Trump.

Grand National record

See also
 List of historical horses

References

1957 racehorse births
1988 racehorse deaths
Grand National winners
Racehorses bred in Maryland
Racehorses trained in the United States
Racehorses trained in the United Kingdom
Thoroughbred family A1
United States Thoroughbred Racing Hall of Fame inductees